Dolicharthria daralis is a species of moth in the family Crambidae. It was described by Pierre Chrétien in 1911. It is found in Spain, on the Canary Islands and North Africa, including Tunisia, Algeria and Morocco.

References

Moths described in 1911
Spilomelinae
Moths of Europe
Moths of Africa